St Thomas More Catholic School is a co-educational Roman Catholic secondary school located in Buxton in the English county of Derbyshire. The school is named after Saint Thomas More, a sixteenth century elder statesman who was martyred for his refusal to accept King Henry VIII's claim to be the supreme head of the church. The school is under the jurisdiction of the Roman Catholic Diocese of Nottingham.

Previously a voluntary aided school administered by Derbyshire County Council, in September 2018 St Thomas More Catholic School converted to academy status. The school is now sponsored by the St Ralph Sherwin Catholic Multi Academy Trust.

St Thomas More Catholic School educates pupils from all over High Peak, with some students travelling from Staffordshire and Cheshire to attend. The school offers GCSEs and BTECs as programmes of study for pupils.

References

External links
St Thomas More Catholic School official website

Secondary schools in Derbyshire
Catholic secondary schools in the Diocese of Nottingham
Academies in Derbyshire
Buxton